Notoreas atmogramma is a species of moth in the family Geometridae. This species is endemic to New Zealand. It is a day flying moth that frequents alpine habitat.

Taxonomy
This species was described by Edward Meyrick in 1911 using material collected by George Hudson at Mount Holdsworth in the Tararua Range at an altitude of approximately 1200m. Hudson discussed and illustrated this species in his 1928 publication The Butterflies and Moths of New Zealand. The lectotype specimen is held at the Natural History Museum, London.

Description

Meyrick described the species as follows:

Distribution

This species is endemic to New Zealand. Along with Mount Holdsworth, this species has been found at Mount Taranaki, the Pouakai Range in Taranaki, and Lewis Pass.

Biology and behaviour
This species is on the wing in January and February. It is an alpine moth that is active during the day.

Habitat and host species
The species frequents open grass alpine habitat. Larvae of species within the genus Notoreas feed exclusively on plants within the genera Pimelea and Kelleria.

References

Moths described in 1911
Moths of New Zealand
Larentiinae
Endemic fauna of New Zealand
Taxa named by Edward Meyrick
Endemic moths of New Zealand